The account of the JATO Rocket Car was one of the original Darwin Awards winners: a man who supposedly met his death in a spectacular manner after mounting a JATO unit (a rocket engine used to help heavy aircraft to take off) onto an ordinary automobile. It was originally circulated as a forwarded email.

In 1996, after numerous inquires, the Arizona Department of Public Safety issued a news release posted on their website concerning the story. It termed the story "an Arizona myth."

The story was also debunked in 2003 on the pilot episode of MythBusters, titled "Jet Assisted Chevy".

Usenet posting 
This is the text as it appears, possibly most frequently, in usenet repostings:

History 
The original Darwin Awards were fictitious. Both were contained in a 1990 Version  posted to rec.models.rockets of the JATO Rocket Car urban legend. When this urban legend was debunked, it was specifically pointed out that the mentioned Darwin Awards were fictitious. It contained a reference to the 1985 mention of a Vending Machine Tipover Darwin Award.  It was Paul Vixie who wrote this introduction to the JATO urban legend that first included the term "Darwin Award". Vixie credits Charles Haynes with making the (informal) Darwin Award Nomination, but it was Vixie's specific wording, with the first sentence crediting Haynes stripped off, that was actually circulated and actually referred to the Darwin Awards as if they actually existed and were common knowledge, though the message wasn't widely circulated until it was reformatted.

It remained fairly dormant until 1995, when the message surfaced again in rec.pyrotechnics with the email header stripped off the introduction, though the main story is still indented. Three days later  the introduction is fully integrated into the story and it appeared on rec.humor in a form that made it a truly infectious meme. Shortly after it was reposted in 1995 it quickly began to spread, being posted on Usenet 24 times within the next month. In 1996 the legend was further embellished with references to the year of manufacture of the car and G-Forces and to the form which was widely circulated via email (55% of all postings on usenet which included "JATO Rocket Darwin Award impala" also included "g-forces".

Cult of the Dead Cow, a hacker group and ezine, published an extensive elaboration in 1998 that claims to explain how the story came into being, describing the most common details of the Rocket Car legend. Four males under 25 engaged in scouting, welding, drinking, and Rube Goldberg engineering to build a rocket rail car after they happened upon JATOs in a junk pile. Supposed author CarInTheCliff also describes the car's only test plus the elements he has added while discouraging repeats by example. In this account it is also claimed that the story had first circulated long before 1990.

The Darwin Awards meme was also spread by Wendy Northcutt, who collected the Darwin Awards on a public website in 1993, and circulated new stories in a regular newsletter.

The MythBusters investigation
To test the story – the very first myth they tackled – Jamie Hyneman and Adam Savage, with help from honorary MythBuster Erik Gates, procured a 1966 Chevrolet Impala, and after they were unable to obtain actual JATOs, they substituted three model rockets in succession to produce an equivalent amount of thrust (3000 horsepower for 15 seconds). They also installed a rocket rack and reinforced the car so that the rockets would not tear off the roof, and even made use of a hydraulic system that the previous owner had installed on the car to lower the front of the car and make it more aerodynamic. However, when tested in the Mojave Desert, the car did not go anywhere near the  reported in the original story, and failed to become airborne.

The program has revisited the story twice, in 2007's "Supersized Myths" (the rockets exploded on the ramp) and their 10th Anniversary episode "JATO Rocket Car: Mission Accomplished?". The 12 motors were built by John Newman, Rick Maschek, and others with one motor first being static tested, successfully, at the FAR site (Friends of Amateur Rocketry) to avoid another explosion. On the two cars used, the motors were stacked vertically to keep the cars going straight in the event one or more of the motors did not ignite.  The car was weighted towards the front in an attempt to improve its aerodynamic stability but no attempt was made to ensure the center of thrust (CoT) of the rocket pack was being applied through the center of gravity (CoG) of the car. The CoT proved to be far too high above the CoG causing the car to immediately nosedive as it left the ramp and smash into the ground. The still firing motors propelled the car up into the air a second time where it did a rotation until smashing into the ground.

Dodge Coronet TV ad 
To advertise the stopping power (rather than speed) of the 1958 Dodge Coronet's 'total contact' brakes, a JATO bottle was fitted to a Coronet and it was driven at speed across the El Mirage dry lake. This commercial was broadcast during the Dodge-sponsored Lawrence Welk Show.

See also
Rocket car
Jack Parsons, rocket engineer who pioneered JATO and died in an explosion in 1952

References

External links 

 Possibly the true story by those who started it (The original link, http://www.rocketcar.com, is 404, the domain expired and has been taken over, and the site is blocked from the Internet Archive by robots.txt.)
 Article at Snopes
 Article at DarwinAwards.com

Urban legends
Technology folklore
Rocket cars